The following lists events that happened during 1959 in Cape Verde.

Incumbents
Colonial governor: Silvino Silvério Marques

Events

Births
February 11: Adriano Spencer, footballer who played in Portugal (d. 2006)
May 29: Maria Helena Semedo, economist and politician

References

 
1959 in the Portuguese Empire
Years of the 20th century in Cape Verde
1950s in Cape Verde
Cape Verde
Cape Verde